Reds de la Ciudad de México (English: Mexico City Reds) are an American football team based in Mexico City, Mexico. The Reds compete in the Liga de Fútbol Americano Profesional, the top American football league in Mexico. The team plays its home games at the Estadio ITESM CCM.

History

Beginnings
The team was established in 2020 as Rojos de Lindavista and joined Fútbol Americano de México (FAM) as an expansion team to compete in  the 2020 season; nevertheless, the season was canceled on March 2020 due to the COVID-19 pandemic with only four games played (the Rojos had a 1–3 record at the moment that the season was canceled).

Raúl Rivera era (2020–present)
In October 2020, the team was rebranded as Rojos CDMX and Raúl Rivera, who previously led Pumas CU to several college championships, was appointed as head coach.

The 2021 FAM season was also canceled due to the COVID-19 pandemic and the league returned to play in 2022. The Rojos won the 2022 FAM season after finishing the regular season with a 6–2 record and as the second best team. In the semifinals, they defeated the Cabo Marlins 40–0 and won the final against the Parrilleros de Monterrey 21–14.

On 14 September 2022, after the dissolution of FAM, the team, now rebranded as Reds, joined the Liga de Fútbol Americano Profesional as one of the three expansions teams ahead of the 2023 LFA season, the others being Caudillos de Chihuahua and Jefes de Ciudad Juárez. It was also announced that the team will play in the Estadio Jesús Martínez "Palillo"; nevertheless, it was later announced that the team would play in the Estadio ITESM CCM, with a capacity of 2,500 spectators.

Team names
 Rojos de Lindavista (2020)
 Rojos CDMX (2021–2022)
 Reds de la Ciudad de México (2023–present)

Roster

Staff

Season-by-season

References

Liga de Fútbol Americano Profesional teams
2020 establishments in Mexico
American football teams established in 2020
Sports teams in Mexico City